West Bund Art & Design or the "West Bund Art & Design Fair" is an annual international contemporary art fair held Shanghai, China during November.

Location
West Bund Art & Design is located on the western side of the Huangpu River in Shanghai's Xuhui District.

History
Founded in 2014, West Bund Art & Design arranges Shanghai's largest and most prestigious art exhibition. This event, which is held from November eighth to November eleventh, is attended by both domestic and international galleries and artists. Since the founding of West Bund Art & Design, other galleries and institutions have established themselves in the West Bund district, such as the Long Museum and ShanghART Gallery.

Since 2016 ArtReview Asia has collaborated with West Bund Art & Design to curate 'Xiàn Chǎng', a series of solo artist projects both within the fair around the local area.

Art 24 Hours
West Bund Art & Design has recently organized 'Art 24 Hours', an event which networks between galleries and museums in Shanghai to further develop Shanghai's art scene.

Transportation
The closest Shanghai Metro station in the vicinity of West Bund Art & Design is Yunjin Road Station (on Line 11).

Gallery

See also
 Long Museum
 50 Moganshan Road
 Power Station of Art
 China Art Museum
 Museum of Contemporary Art Shanghai
 Shanghai Museum
 798 Art Zone

References

External links
 Official website

Art festivals in China